Matthew Anthony Dunn (August 15, 1886 – February 13, 1942) was a Democratic member of the U.S. House of Representatives from Pennsylvania.

Biography
Matthew A. Dunn was born in Braddock, Pennsylvania.  As a result of numerous accidents he lost the sight of his left eye at the age of twelve and that of his right eye at the age of twenty. He attended the School for the Blind in Pittsburgh and graduated from Overbrook School for the Blind in Overbrook, Philadelphia, Pennsylvania, in 1909.  He was engaged in the sale of periodicals and newspapers in 1907 and 1908, and in the insurance brokerage business from 1920 to 1924. He was member of the Pennsylvania State House of Representatives from 1926 to 1932.

Dunn was elected as a Democrat to the Seventy-third and to the three succeeding Congresses. He served as Chairman of the United States House Committee on the Census during the Seventy-sixth Congress.  He was not a candidate for renomination in 1940 due to ill health, and thus retired from active business. He died in Pittsburgh, Pennsylvania, and was interred in Homewood Cemetery.

External links

The Political Graveyard

American politicians with disabilities
Democratic Party members of the Pennsylvania House of Representatives
American blind people
Blind politicians
1886 births
1942 deaths
Politicians from Pittsburgh
People from Braddock, Pennsylvania
Democratic Party members of the United States House of Representatives from Pennsylvania
Burials at Homewood Cemetery
20th-century American politicians